The 1928–29 NHL season was the 12th season of the National Hockey League. Ten teams played 44 games each. This was the first Stanley Cup final that saw two United States-based teams compete for the cup. The Boston Bruins defeated the New York Rangers two games to none in the best-of-three final.

League business

Notable rule changes
Forward passing was permitted from the neutral zone across the blue line into the attacking zone, as long as no offensive player preceded the puck into the attacking zone; forward passing within the attacking zone was still forbidden. Regular season overtime was changed to a 10-minute, non-sudden-death format, to be played in its entirety.

Regular season
Ottawa continued in financial trouble and sold Punch Broadbent to the New York Americans. They continued to erode, and at one point, rumour had it that they would be sold to a Chicago group. Frank Ahearn, the Senators owner, denied this, but admitted that the team was for sale to the highest bidder.

The New York Americans, last place finishers in 1927–28, surprised everyone by occupying first place for much of the season in the Canadian Division. They were held up by the great play of defenceman Lionel Conacher and goaltender Roy Worters. However, the Montreal Canadiens dislodged the Americans and finished first. Boston, led by rookie Tiny Thompson in goal, led the American Division.

Bruins' player George Owen was the first NHL player to regularly wear headgear for protective purposes. Prior to this, the only time protective headgear was worn was to temporarily protect injuries. Fifty-one years later the NHL mandated the use of helmets. Craig MacTavish was the last NHL player to not wear a helmet, retiring in 1997.

The Chicago Black Hawks set records for goal scoring futility, scoring on average less than one goal per game (33), while giving up a league worst 85 goals against. In one stretch from February 7 through February 28, the Hawks were shut out in eight consecutive games. Forward Vic Ripley was the Hawks' leading goal scorer with only 11 goals and 2 assists for 13 points for the entire 44-game season.

The season produced a record 120 shutouts in the 220 games played. George Hainsworth, Canadiens goaltender, set an NHL record that remains unmatched through the 2015–16 season of 22 shutouts and a 0.92 goals against average. Seven other goaltenders hit double digits in shutouts.

Final standings

Note: W = Wins, L = Losses, T = Ties, Pts = Points, GF = Goals For, GA = Goals Against, PIM = Penalties in minutes

Note: Teams that qualified for the playoffs are highlighted in bold

Playoffs

The playoff format was revised to match the divisional first-place teams in a best-of-five semifinal. The divisional second-place teams and third-place teams played off in a two-game total-goals series to determine the participants for the other best-of-three semifinal. The semifinal winners then played off in a best-of-three series for the Cup.

Playoff bracket

Quarterfinals

(A2) New York Rangers vs. (C2) New York Americans

(C3) Toronto Maple Leafs vs. (A3) Detroit Cougars

Semifinals

(C1) Montreal Canadiens vs. (A1) Boston Bruins

(A2) New York Rangers vs. (C3) Toronto Maple Leafs

Stanley Cup Finals

The Bruins won their first Stanley Cup defeating the Rangers. In the process, Boston became one of the few Cup winners in history to not lose a single game in the playoffs, and the last team until 1952 to go undefeated in the playoffs.

Awards
Frank Boucher won his second consecutive Lady Byng award and George Hainsworth won his third consecutive Vezina Trophy.

Player statistics

Scoring leaders
Note: GP = Games played, G = Goals, A = Assists, PTS = Points, PIM = Penalties in minutes

Source: NHL.

Leading goaltenders
Note: GP = Games played; Mins = Minutes played; GA = Goals against; SO = Shutouts; GAA = Goals against average

Source: hockey-reference.com

Coaches

American Division
Boston Bruins: Art Ross
Chicago Black Hawks: Herb Gardiner and Dick Irvin
Detroit Cougars: Jack Adams
New York Rangers: Lester Patrick
Pittsburgh Pirates: Odie Cleghorn

Canadian Division
Montreal Canadiens: Cecil Hart
Montreal Maroons: Eddie Gerard
New York Americans: Tommy Gorman
Ottawa Senators: Dave Gill
Toronto Maple Leafs: Conn Smythe

Debuts
The following is a list of players of note who played their first NHL game in 1928–29 (listed with their first team, asterisk(*) marks debut in playoffs):
Tiny Thompson, Boston Bruins
Cooney Weiland, Boston Bruins
George Owen, Boston Bruins
Johnny Gottselig, Chicago Black Hawks
Mush March, Chicago Black Hawks
Herbie Lewis, Detroit Cougars
Georges Mantha, Montreal Canadiens
Armand Mondou, Montreal Canadiens
Baldy Northcott, Montreal Maroons
Dave Trottier, Montreal Maroons
Earl Robinson, Montreal Maroons
Red Horner, Toronto Maple Leafs
Andy Blair, Toronto Maple Leafs

Last games
The following is a list of players of note that played their last game in the NHL in 1928–29 (listed with their last team):
Cy Denneny, Boston Bruins
Duke Keats, Chicago Black Hawks
Dick Irvin, Chicago Black Hawks
Red Green, Detroit Cougars
Herb Gardiner, Montreal Canadiens
Punch Broadbent, New York Americans

See also
1928–29 NHL transactions
List of Stanley Cup champions
1928 in sports
1929 in sports

References
 
 
 
 
 

Notes

External links
Hockey Database
NHL.com

 
NHL
NHL